Hannah Bat Shahar (born 1944) is an Israeli writer.

She was born in Jerusalem, 1944. She is a Hebrew Language mentor at Yeshiva University.

She received the 1994 Prime Minister's Prize.

Published works
Sipurei Ha-Kos (Stories of the Owl), stories, Tcherikover, 1987
Likroh La-Atalefim (Calling the Bats), stories, Keter, 1990
Rikud Ha-Parpar (The Dancing Butterfly), stories, Keter, 1993
Sham Sirot Ha-Dayig (Look, the Fishing Boats), three novellas, Hakibbutz Hameuchad/ Siman Kriah, 1997
Yonkey Ha-Devash Ha- Metukim (Sweet Honey Birds), stories, Hakibbutz Hameuchad/Siman Kriah, 1999
Ha-Naara Mi-Agam Mishigan (The Girl From Lake Michigan), novel, Hakibbutz Hameuchad/ Siman Kriah, 2002
Nimfa Levana, Seira Meshugaat (White Nymph, Wild Satyr), novel, Hakibbutz Hameuchad, 2005
Tzlalim Ba-Rei (Shadows in the Mirror), novel, Kinneret, Zmora-Bitan, Dvir, 2008

See also
Hebrew literature

References

External links
Modern Hebrew literature, Issues 1–4, Makhon le-tirgum sifrut Ivrit, Institute for the Translation of Hebrew Literature, 2004, 

1944 births
Living people
People from Jerusalem
Hebrew-language writers
Israeli women writers